Target Earth is the thirteenth studio album, and the sixteenth release overall, by the Canadian heavy metal band Voivod, which was released on January 22, 2013. This is the first Voivod studio album to feature Daniel Mongrain on guitar (replacing the late Denis D'Amour) and the only one since 1991's Angel Rat with Jean-Yves Thériault on bass.

Background
After the 2005 death of Denis "Piggy" D'Amour, Voivod created two albums to realize the song ideas that he had left behind.  With that material having been transformed into songs (as heard on Katorz and Infini), Voivod did not know what its future would involve.  However, the band eventually decided to continue provided that the band, according to Michel "Away" Langevin, could "preserve the Voivod essence" and keep "Piggy's spirit intact."

The main songwriters on Target Earth were Jean-Yves "Blacky" Theriault, in his first songwriting credit with Voivod since 1991, and Daniel "Chewy" Mongrain, who replaced Piggy. As Langevin explained, Mongrain's role was both challenging and natural: "He [Mongrain] had to think from his point of view how Voivod should sound like nowadays...He learned to play guitar listening to Voivod, and he knows all the albums, he's a fan of all the eras, so it feels very natural for him to write Voivodian material."

Mongrain, a long-time fan of Voivod, was openly reverent about the role that he would play in succeeding Piggy as the guitarist for the band.

Part of realizing that distinctive sound involved breaking down Piggy's approach into its constituent elements, according to Mongrain.  Mongrain specifically referenced the signature chords of King Crimson as giving Voivod its "color". "Piggy was a big progressive music fan," Mongrain said. "These chords are the most dissonant you can get and in Voivod, Piggy would throw them everywhere. It has that crazy, chaotic, end-of-the-world, post-nuclear vibe that's really associated with Voivod now."  Langevin also specifically references the "progressive thrash metal" sound of Target Earth, which he contrasts to the "stoner-punk-metal" approach of the previous three albums that Voivod completed with bassist Jason Newsted.

Reception

Target Earth has received generally positive reviews, including a metascore of 84/100 on Metacritic based on 7 critics.

AllMusic proclaimed that "older fans can breathe a sigh of relief: Target Earth is not only better than we had any right to expect, it's relentlessly creative, inspired, and manic."  Exclaim! praised Dan Mongrain's ability to play in Piggy's style without being merely imitative and noted that fears that Voivod would be unable to recapture the classic magic were "shattered within moments of the title track." Popmatters opined that, "were it not for the modern production you would be led to believe Target Earth is the natural successor to Nothingface in terms of being more rhythmically complex, forceful and lively than Voïvod have sounded in an age."

However, The Quietus criticized the album for failing to connect with the listener, speculating that fans of War and Pain and Killing Technology "may find Target Earth laborious, even alienating in its prog meanderings and long running time."

Track listing

Personnel
Voivod
Denis Bélanger (Snake) – vocals
Daniel Mongrain (Chewy) – guitar
Jean-Yves Thériault (Blacky) – bass, engineer
Michel Langevin (Away) – drums, artwork

Additional musicians
Katajjaq Inuit - additional vocals on track 2
Periklis Tsoukalas - additional performance on track 3

Production
Pierre Rémillard - engineer
Martin Brunet, Peter Edwards - assistant engineers
Sanford Parker - mixing
Colin Jordan - mastering

References

Voivod (band) albums
2013 albums
Century Media Records albums